Ulla-Britta Lagerroth  (née Holmström; born 19 October 1927) was a Swedish literary critic.

Her academic career includes professorship at the University of Lund.

She was awarded the Dobloug Prize in 1989.

Lagerroth died on 8 December 2021.

References

1927 births
Living people
People from Malmö
Academic staff of Lund University